The 2016–17 season is Scunthorpe United's 118th season in their existence and their third consecutive season in League One. Along with competing in League One, the club also participated in the FA Cup, League Cup and JP Trophy. The season covers the period from 1 July 2016 to 30 June 2017.

Squad

Statistics

|-
|colspan=14|Player(s) currently out on loan:

|}

Goals record

Disciplinary record

Transfers

Transfers in

Transfers out

Loans In

Loans out

Competitions

Pre-season friendlies

League One

League table

Matches

Play-offs

FA Cup

EFL Cup

EFL Trophy

References

Scunthorpe United
Scunthorpe United F.C. seasons